Waman Marka (Quechua waman falcon, marka village, also spelled Huaman Marca, Huamanmarca, Huamanmarka, Wamanmarca) may refer to:

 Waman Marka (Junín), a mountain in the Marcapomacocha District, Yauli Province, Junín Region, Peru
 Waman Marka (La Oroya), a mountain in the La Oroya District, Yauli Province, Junín Region, Peru
 Wamanmarka, Chumbivilcas, an archaeological site in the Chumbivilcas Province, Cusco Region, Peru
 Wamanmarka, La Convención, an archaeological site in the La Convención Province, Cusco Region, Peru
 Wamanmarka, Lima, an archaeological site in the Lima Region, Peru